Sholamadevi  is a village in Tiruchirappalli taluk of Tiruchirappalli district in Tamil Nadu, India.

Demographics 

As per the 2001 census, Sholamadevi had a population of 2,293 with 1,184 males and 1,109 females. The sex ratio was 937 and the literacy rate, 85.32.

References 

 

Villages in Tiruchirappalli district